Hard Love may refer to:
Hard Love (novel), an award-winning young adult novel written by author Ellen Wittlinger
Hard Love (album), a 2016 album by Needtobreathe
"Hard Love", the title track from the album above
"Hard Love", a 2016 song by Ellie Drennan
"Hard Love", a 2017 album by Strand of Oaks